Göran Erik Göransson (born 7 May 1956) is a Swedish former footballer and manager who most notably played for AIK and managed the Sweden U21 team. He made 363 official appearances for AIK, helping them win two Svenska Cupen titles and finishing first during the 1983 regular Allsvenskan season.

Club career

AIK 
Göransson made his AIK debut at only 17 years of age on 13 April 1974 against GAIS, as one of the youngest debutants ever for the club. He scored his first league goal for the club in a derby against Djurgårdens IF on 10 June 1976. In 1976, he helped the team win the 1975–76 Svenska Cupen title. During the 1983 Allsvenskan season, he led his team to the regular season title, before IFK Göteborg were crowned Swedish Champions after eliminating AIK in the semi-finals of the 1983 Allsvenskan Play-offs. In 1985, Göransson won his second Svenska Cupen title with AIK.

Väsby IK 
After the 1986 Allsvenskan season Göransson left AIK for Väsby IK, where he spent three seasons, helping the team win promotion to Division 1 in 1987.

Return to AIK and retirement 
Göransson returned to AIK for one last season ahead of the 1990 Allsvenskan season, and played in 20 league games as AIK finished 8th in the table.

In total, Göransson made 363 official appearances for AIK, which for a long time was a club record. He has since been overtaken by Daniel Tjernström (395 games) and Per Karlsson (396 games as of 16 July 2020).

International career 
Göransson made his debut for the Sweden U19 team in a 2–0 win against the Netherlands on 19 September 1973. He debuted for the Sweden U21 team on 2 September 1975 in a 2–0 win against Finland.

Göransson was close to making his debut for the senior Sweden national team in both 1977 and 1979, but never fielded.

Career statistics 

[a] Appearances in the 1982 Relegation play-offs.

[b] Appearances in the UEFA Cup.

[c] Appearances in the UEFA Intertoto Cup.

[d] Appearances in the UEFA Cup Winners' Cup.

Honours 
AIK
 Allsvenskan: 1983
 Division 2 Norra: 1980
 Svenska Cupen: 1975–76, 1984–85
Väsby IK
 Division 2 Mellersta: 1987

References 

1956 births
Living people
Swedish footballers
AIK Fotboll players
Väsby IK players
Association football midfielders
Swedish football managers
AIK Fotboll non-playing staff
Hammarby Fotboll managers
Väsby IK managers
Footballers from Stockholm